Lavans may refer to:

Lavans-lès-Dole, a commune in the Jura department in Franche-Comté in eastern France
Lavans-lès-Saint-Claude, a commune in the Jura department in Bourgogne-Franche-Comté in eastern France
Lavans-Quingey, a commune in the Doubs department in the Bourgogne-Franche-Comté region in eastern France
Lavans-sur-Valouse, a commune in the Jura department in Franche-Comté in eastern France
Lavans-Vuillafans, a commune in the Doubs department in the Bourgogne-Franche-Comté region in eastern France

See also
Lavan (disambiguation)